Castlevania III: Dracula's Curse is an action-adventure platform video game developed and published by Konami for the Nintendo Entertainment System. It was released in Japan in 1989, and in North America in 1990, and in Europe by Palcom in 1992. It was later released on the Virtual Console for the Wii, Nintendo 3DS, and Wii U.

Castlevania III: Dracula's Curse is the third installment in the Castlevania video game series. It is a prequel to the original Castlevania (much like the earlier Game Boy game Castlevania: The Adventure), set a few centuries before the events of the original game. The game's protagonist is Trevor C. Belmont, an ancestor of the original hero Simon Belmont.

Gameplay

Castlevania III abandons the action-adventure and role-playing elements of its immediate predecessor Castlevania II: Simon's Quest and returns to the platform game roots of the first Castlevania title. Unlike Castlevania, however, Castlevania III is non-linear: Trevor, the main character, can be assisted by one of three possible companions, and after completing the first level, and at several other points throughout the game, the player is given a choice of two branching paths to follow. The player can obtain multiple endings depending on the choices they make throughout the game.

There are two main routes through the game's sixteen stages, which are referred to as blocks and are broken down into several sections. The second stage is an optional excursion for picking up one of the three partner characters, and the main branch occurs part way through the third stage. Each route contains a total of nine stages (ten if the player takes the optional second stage). The upper route takes the player across the lake to the main bridge, entering Dracula's castle through the front gate, while the lower route takes the player through a series of tunnels and caverns, leading to a climb up the cliff face below the castle. The lower route also features one short branching section of its own at stage 6. The two paths converge in the main hall of the castle.

Plot
The year is 1476, and Count Dracula has started to ravage Europe with an army of monsters. The Belmont family of vampire hunters, once exiled from Wallachia, are called into action. They feared the Belmonts' "super-human" power, but with Dracula menacing to swallow Europe in darkness, they are left with no choice but to call Trevor Belmont (Ralph C. Belmondo in the Japanese version), current wielder of the Vampire Killer whip.

Joining Trevor Belmont in his mission to defeat Dracula are three new playable characters: Sypha Belnades, a young sorceress with poor physical attack power but powerful elemental magic spells at her disposal; Grant Danasty, a pirate with the ability to climb on walls and change direction in mid-jump (a rare ability in earlier games of the series); and Alucard, Dracula's son, a dhampir with the ability to shoot fireballs and transform into a bat. Trevor can be accompanied by only one companion at a time. If he chooses to take on another he must abandon his current companion. The player can "spiritually transform" between Trevor and his ally with the "select" button. Both Trevor and whoever is accompanying him share the same health meter and heart counter. The ending of the game differs depending on which companion Trevor has with him at the time, or if he does not take another character with him at all.

Development and release
Besides the different title, Akumajō Densetsu, the Japanese version has several other differences. It contains a specialized "VRC6" coprocessor chip. The game's audio programmer, Hidenori Maezawa, assisted in the chip's creation. This chip added two extra pulse wave channels and a saw wave channel to the system's initial set of five sound channels. The majority of the music combines the channels to imitate the sound of a synthesized string section. Western versions of the NES did not have the ability to support external sound chips, so the North American release replaced the VRC6 with Nintendo's Memory Management Controller 5 (MMC5). The MMC5 chip's sound channels cannot be used with the NES, and the game's music had to be changed by Yoshinori Sasaki to comply with the NES's standard five channels. Akumajō Dracula Famicom Best was a soundtrack album that included the Famicom version of the game's original music.

In the Japanese version, instead of using a stabbing dagger, Grant throws daggers as his main attack. Some enemies do less damage in the Japanese version, and had their sprites changed for the Western releases. Some instances of nudity on the enemies were censored, and religious iconography was pared down. The Japanese version has slightly different backgrounds in many stages, and has special effects not seen in the North American and European releases.

The North American and PAL versions have several hidden features that can be accessed by entering a certain name for the player, which include starting the game with 10 lives (by entering the name "HELP ME"), the option to start the game with any of the three spirit partners, and to access the second, more difficult quest. These features are not present in the Japanese version.

Castlevania III was the first game in the series to have different packaging artwork outside Japan, painted by Tom Dubois using alkyd paints. It was inspired by Ray Harryhausen. Dubois would go on to design the North American packaging for Super Castlevania IV, Castlevania II: Belmont's Revenge and Castlevania: Bloodlines.

It was released in Japan on December 22, 1989, in North America on September 1, 1990, and in Europe on December 10, 1992. The game also received a Windows release on November 16, 2002.

It was released on the Wii Virtual Console in the PAL regions on October 31, 2008, in North America on January 12, 2009 and in Japan on April 21, 2009. It was released on the Nintendo 3DS Virtual Console in the PAL regions on April 17, 2014 and in North America on June 26, 2014. It was released on the Wii U Virtual Console in Japan on April 16, 2014, in North America on June 26, 2014 and in the PAL regions on September 4, 2014.

It was later released again as part of the Castlevania Anniversary Collection for Xbox One, PlayStation 4, and Nintendo Switch on May 16, 2019. The Famicom version was made  available to western audiences for the first time as a bonus update to this collection a month later.

Reception 

Japanese game magazine Famitsu gave it a 30 out of 40 score, praising it for a return to the first game's format, the new allies, and the upgraded sound, but knocking points off for excessive difficulty. In 1997 Electronic Gaming Monthly ranked it the 57th best console video game of all time, citing the multiple playable characters and routes to choose from and the outstanding graphics and music. Nintendo Power listed it as the ninth best Nintendo Entertainment System video game, praising it for its strong improvements over previous entries in the series. Game Informers Tim Turi felt that it was a return to form after Castlevania II. He discussed characters such as Alucard (whom he called iconic) and Grant (whom he praised for his wall cling ability). GamesRadar ranked it the eighth best NES game ever made. The staff felt that it returned to Castlevanias roots after Castlevania II yet "took the series to new heights." GameZone ranked it as the third best Castlevania title. The staff preferred III the most as it felt like the original game the most; they felt its price on the Virtual Console was worthwhile.

In a retrospective review, Allgame editor Christopher Michael Baker highly praised the game, describing it as "the greatest Castlevania game to ever grace the NES" and "possibly even the greatest Castlevania game to ever hit any system".

IGN placed Castlevania III: Dracula's Curse 5th on their list of the Top 100 NES Games.

Former Castlevania Producer and developer Koji Igarashi cites Castlevania III as his favorite game in the series, noting the sound and setting as the reasons. Shutaro Iida, who was a programmer for the GBA and NDS games and director of Castlevania: Harmony of Despair, also said it is his favorite in the series, and cited the special sound chip in the Japanese version as the reason why.

In other media
The 1991 Captain N: The Game Master episode "Return to Castlevania" was based on this game.

An animated Dracula's Curse movie had been in development since 2007 with writer Warren Ellis, Frederator Studios, and James Jean attached to the project. In August 2015, film producer Adi Shankar teased that the project, now an animated mini series, was finally in production. Titled simply Castlevania, the first season of the series premiered on Netflix on July 7, 2017. After the 4-episode first season premiere, it was later renewed for an 8-episode second series which premiered on October 26, 2018. A ten-episode third season was released on March 5, 2020. The final season, consisting of 10 episodes, was released on May 13, 2021.

Notes

References

External links

1989 video games
1980s horror video games
Dracula's Curse
Fiction set in the 1470s
Nintendo Entertainment System games
Patricide in fiction
Platform games
Single-player video games
Video game prequels
Video games about curses
Video games developed in Japan
Video games featuring female protagonists
Video games set in the 15th century
Virtual Console games
Virtual Console games for Wii U
Windows games
Virtual Console games for Nintendo 3DS